Correbia felderi is a moth of the subfamily Arctiinae. It was described by Rothschild in 1912. It is found in French Guiana.

References

Euchromiina
Moths described in 1912
Moths of South America